The Udet U 11 Kondor was a German four-engined airliner designed and built by Udet Flugzeugbau, only one was built.

Design and development
The U 11 Kondor was an open-cockpit, metal-fuselage, wooden high-wing monoplane powered by four  Siemens-Halske Sh 12 piston engines in shaft-driven pusher configuration. It had a crew of three and room for eight passengers with a dangerously close clearance between the pusher propellers and rear passenger door, which caused one fatality. The aircraft was tested by Harry Rother near Munich, finding a tail-heavy condition which required addition of larger control surfaces. The only U 11 was first flown on 19 January 1926 and was refused by Deutsche Luft-Reederei then purchased by Deutsche Luft Hansa, crashing on its delivery flight. The cost to develop and produce the prototype was a factor in the collapse of the company, which was then taken over by Bayerische Flugzeugwerke.

Specifications (U 11)

See also

References

Notes

Bibliography

External links

Udet U 11
Flickr Photo

U 11
1920s German airliners
Aircraft first flown in 1926
High-wing aircraft
Four-engined pusher aircraft